In geometry, the parabigyrate rhombicosidodecahedron is one of the Johnson solids. It can be constructed as a rhombicosidodecahedron with two opposing pentagonal cupolae rotated through 36 degrees. It is also a canonical polyhedron.

Alternative Johnson solids, constructed by rotating different cupolae of a rhombicosidodecahedron, are: 
 The gyrate rhombicosidodecahedron where only one cupola is rotated;
 The metabigyrate rhombicosidodecahedron where two non-opposing cupolae are rotated;
 And the trigyrate rhombicosidodecahedron where three cupolae are rotated.

External links
 

Johnson solids